The 2005 Phillip Island Superbike World Championship round was the second round of the 2005 Superbike World Championship. It took place over the weekend of 1–3 April 2005 at the Phillip Island Grand Prix Circuit near Cowes, Victoria, Australia.

Results

Superbike race 1 classification

Superbike race 2 classification

Supersport race classification

References
 Superbike Race 1
 Superbike Race 2
 Supersport Race

Motorsport at Phillip Island
Philip Island
Phillip Island